Duron Harmon (born January 24, 1991) is an American football free safety for the Las Vegas Raiders of the National Football League (NFL). Drafted by the New England Patriots in the third round of the 2013 NFL Draft after playing college football at Rutgers, Harmon was nicknamed "the Closer" by fans and media for his ability to come up with late, game-sealing interceptions during his Patriots tenure. Harmon has also played for the Detroit Lions, and Atlanta Falcons.

Early years
Harmon was raised in Magnolia, Delaware.  He attended Caesar Rodney High School in Camden, Delaware, and played high school football for the Caesar Rodney Riders.

College career
While attending Rutgers University, Harmon played for the Rutgers Scarlet Knights football team from 2009 to 2012.  Following his senior season in 2012, he was a first-team All-Big East Conference selection at safety and participated in the NFLPA Collegiate Bowl.

Professional career
Coming out of Rutgers, Harmon was not one of the 60 defensive backs to receive an invitation to the NFL Scouting Combine. On March 13, 2013, he was one of 17 prospects to attend Rutger's Pro day. Harmon performed all of the required combine and positional drills for scouts and team representatives from all 32 NFL teams. At the conclusion of the pre-draft process, Harmon was projected to be a seventh round pick or undrafted free agent by NFL draft experts and scouts. He was ranked the 16th best strong safety prospect in the draft by DraftScout.com.

New England Patriots

2013
The New England Patriots selected Harmon in the third round, (91st overall) of the 2013 NFL Draft. He was the second defensive back selected by the Patriots in 2013, along with Logan Ryan (84th overall). The selection of Harmon by the Patriots in the third round surprised many draft evaluators and analysts and was seen as a reach. When his selection was announced, ESPN and the NFL Network failed to play his college highlights as typically done with draft announcements since they weren't expecting him to be drafted.

On May 15, 2013, the New England Patriots signed Harmon to a four-year, $2.711 million contract that included a $533,600 signing bonus.

Throughout training camp, he competed against Adrian Wilson, Steve Gregory, and Tavon Wilson for the job as the starting strong safety after it was left vacant by the departure of Patrick Chung. Head coach Bill Belichick named Harmon the backup strong safety behind Steve Gregory to start the regular season.

He made his professional regular season debut in the New England Patriots' Week 2 matchup against the New York Jets and made one tackle in their 13-10 victory. In Week 8, he deflected a pass and made his first career interception off Ryan Tannehill in their 27-17 victory against the Miami Dolphins. The following week, he recorded four combined tackles, deflected a pass, and returned an interception by Ben Roethlisberger for 42 yards during their 55-31 victory against the Pittsburgh Steelers. On November 18, 2013, Harmon earned his first career start in place of Steve Gregory, who suffered an injured finger earlier in the week. He made three solo tackles in the Patriots' 24-20 loss at the Carolina Panthers. The following week, he made his second consecutive start the following week and recorded a season-high 11 combined tackles during their 34-31 win against the Denver Broncos.

2014
Entering training camp in 2014, Harmon was slated to be the starting strong safety after the departure of Steve Gregory. He competed against Kanorris Davis and Patrick Chung and ultimately lost the job to Chung and was relegated to backup strong safety.

In Week 6, Harmon recorded a season-high three combined tackles during a 37–22 win at the Buffalo Bills. On December 14, 2014, Harmon returned an interception by Ryan Tannehill for 60-yards as the Patriots defeated the Miami Dolphins 41-13. In the divisional round of the 2014 playoffs, Harmon intercepted Joe Flacco's pass with less than two minutes remaining in the game allowing the Patriots to hold onto a 35–31 win over the Baltimore Ravens. "That's the biggest pick of my life," Harmon said after the game. Harmon and the Patriots would go on to win Super Bowl XLIX over the Seattle Seahawks.

2015–2016
In the 2015 and 2016 seasons, Harmon was mainly used as the Patriots' third safety alongside Devin McCourty and Patrick Chung primarily in nickel and dime packages.

In the Divisional Round of the 2016 playoffs, Harmon intercepted Houston Texans' quarterback Brock Osweiler—after fellow Rutgers alums Devin McCourty and Logan Ryan each had picks of their own—in a 34–16 victory. On February 5, 2017, Harmon won his second career Super Bowl championship as the Patriots won Super Bowl LI. In the game, he had three tackles and the Patriots defeated the Atlanta Falcons by a score of 34–28 in overtime. The game featured the largest comeback in Super Bowl history as the Patriots trailed by 25 points in the third quarter.

2017
On March 9, 2017, Harmon, who was a free agent at the time, signed a four-year contract worth a maximum of $20 million to remain with the Patriots. The deal included a $5 million signing bonus and $1.5 million in guaranteed salary. On September 5, 2017, Harmon was named a Patriots captain for the first time in his career.

On December 17, 2017, during Week 15 against the Pittsburgh Steelers, Harmon made the game-sealing interception as the Patriots won 27–24, allowing them to clinch the AFC East. The interception was his fourth of the 2017 season, and his third in the final two minutes of a game. The Patriots would go on to have Home field advantage throughout the playoffs and make Super Bowl LII. In the Super Bowl, Harmon recorded 5 tackles and 1 interception in a losing effort to the Philadelphia Eagles.

2018
Harmon switched his jersey number from No. 30 to No. 21 with the arrival of Jason McCourty. Harmon finished the 2018 season with 38 tackles, 4 interceptions, and 4 passes defensed. He helped the Patriots reach Super Bowl LIII where they beat the Los Angeles Rams 13-3.

2019
In week 6 against the New York Giants, Harmon recorded his first interception of the season off Daniel Jones and returned it for 27 yards in the 35-14 win.

Detroit Lions
On March 18, 2020, the Patriots traded Harmon along with a seventh-round draft pick in 2020 to the Detroit Lions in exchange for the Seattle Seahawks' fifth-round 2020 draft pick.

In Week 3 against the Arizona Cardinals, Harmon recorded his first interception as a Lion during the 26–23 win.

Atlanta Falcons
On April 15, 2021, Harmon signed a one-year contract with the Atlanta Falcons.

Las Vegas Raiders
On March 24, 2022, Harmon signed a one-year contract with the Las Vegas Raiders.

NFL career statistics

Regular season

Legal troubles
On March 24, 2018, it was revealed that Harmon had possession of marijuana while landing at Costa Rica. Harmon was detained and denied entry, being sent back to the United States after marijuana and paraphernalia were found in his luggage. About 58 grams of marijuana were found inside a can of iced tea, three pipes with cannabis oil, a THC candy, and four glass containers with compressed marijuana that weighed 4.3 grams. Harmon was not arrested, but was instead sent back.

References

External links
Rutgers Scarlet Knights bio

1991 births
Living people
American football safeties
Atlanta Falcons players
Detroit Lions players
Las Vegas Raiders players
New England Patriots players
People from Kent County, Delaware
Players of American football from Delaware
Rutgers Scarlet Knights football players